= DCMO =

The DCMO (Deputy Chief Management Officer) is a senior military official in the United States Department of Defense who reports directly to the United States Secretary of Defense.

"The Deputy Chief Management Officer (DCMO) is the Principal Staff Assistant and advisor to the Secretary of Defense and Deputy Secretary of Defense for matters relating to the management and improvement of integrated defense business operations. In this role, the DCMO leads the synchronization, integration, and coordination of the DoD’s business functions to ensure optimal alignment in support of the warfighting mission. The DCMO leads the Office of the DCMO."

—

== DCMO (technology) ==
DCMO (Device Capability Management Object) is an Open Mobile Alliance specification that allows a management authority to make use of the functionalities provided by OMA DM v1.2 protocol to remotely manage the device capabilities. (follow this link: http://www.openmobilealliance.org/Technical/release_program/docs/DCMO/V1_0-20081024-C/OMA-TS-DCMO-V1_0-20081024-C.pdf for more details)
